Last Man Standing is the third studio album by Swedish singer-songwriter E-Type, which was released in 1998. It contains hit songs "Angels Crying", "Here I Go Again" and "Princess of Egypt". Nana Hedin provided much of the female lead vocals. The album debuted at number one on the Finnish Albums Chart, staying in the top for total 6 weeks. In Sweden the album peaked # 1 going platinum. The US and Japanese editions of the album were released with different cover art.

The video for "Angels Crying" was based on Friday the 13th.

Track listing

Charts

Certifications

References

E-Type (musician) albums
Albums produced by Max Martin
1998 albums
Stockholm Records albums